Villa El Tato is an urban fragment (fraccionamiento) in the Canelones Department of southern Uruguay. It is part of the wider metropolitan area of Montevideo.

Geography

Location
It is one of several urban fragments that are situated among the city of Pando to the northeast, Joaquín Suárez to the northwest, Colonia Nicolich and the Carrasco International Airport to the southwest and Ciudad de la Costa to the south and southeast. It is located on the street Camino de los Horneros, which is the first parallel east of Route 101.

Population
In 2011, Villa El Tato had a population of 615.
 
Source: Instituto Nacional de Estadística de Uruguay

References

External links
INE map of Villa Aeroparque, Villa El Tato, Lomas de Carrasco, Carmel and Altos de la Tahona

Populated places in the Canelones Department